Brogue is an unincorporated community in Chanceford Township, York County, Pennsylvania, United States.

The unincorporated community of Shenks Ferry is also included in the zip code.

References

Unincorporated communities in York County, Pennsylvania
Unincorporated communities in Pennsylvania